Alva Kitselman House, also known as "Hazelwood" and Parlour @ Hazelwood, is a historic home located at Muncie, Delaware County, Indiana. It was built in 1915, and is a -story, "L"-plan, Colonial Revival style brick mansion. It features a central portico with Ionic order columns and consists of a hipped roof main block with -story rear service wing.  Also on the property are the contributing carriage house and decorative steel fence.  The property was acquired by Parlour Salon Group in 2018.

It was added to the National Register of Historic Places in 1994.

References

External links
Hazelwood Christian Church website

Houses on the National Register of Historic Places in Indiana
Colonial Revival architecture in Indiana
Houses completed in 1915
Houses in Muncie, Indiana
National Register of Historic Places in Muncie, Indiana